Kentrochrysalis sieversi is a species of moth of the family Sphingidae. It is known from the southern part of the Russian Far East, north-eastern China and South Korea.

The wingspan is 88–90 mm. Adults are on wing from mid-May to mid-August in Korea.

The larvae have been recorded feeding on Fraxinus species in Primorskiy Kray.

References

Sphingulini
Moths described in 1897